Boubacar Traoré (born 14 December 1999) is a Malian footballer who plays as a forward for Tunisian club US Monastir.

Career statistics

Club

References

External links
 

1999 births
21st-century Malian people
Living people
Malian footballers
Association football forwards
Stade Malien players
CA Bizertin players
Budapest Honvéd FC players
Sporting Kansas City II players
US Monastir (football) players
Tunisian Ligue Professionnelle 1 players
Nemzeti Bajnokság I players
Malian expatriate footballers
Expatriate footballers in Tunisia
Malian expatriate sportspeople in Tunisia
Expatriate footballers in Hungary
Malian expatriate sportspeople in Hungary
Expatriate soccer players in the United States
Malian expatriate sportspeople in the United States